Pierre-Claver Nuwinkware (Kirundi: Petro Claveri Nuwinkware; died 1972) was a Burundian politician.

Early life 
Pierre-Claver Nuwinkware was ethnically Hutu. He was educated in Catholic schools.

Political career 
Nuwinkware was a member of the Union for National Progress (Union pour le Progrès national). In September 1961 Louis Rwagasore became Prime Minister of Burundi and formed a government with Nuwinkware as Minister of Justice. Following Rwagasore's assassination, André Muhirwa became Prime Minister. Politically, Muhirwa worked to prevent Hutus from gaining influence in government. Nevertheless, Nuwinkware remained a loyal member of his cabinet. He signed the promulgation order of the 1962 Constitution of the Kingdom of Burundi along with Mwami Mwambutsa IV and Muhirwa. Mwambutsa attempted to intervene in national politics to temper ethnic and political divides, but Nuwinkware resisted this, garnering the Mwami's ire.

In late February 1963 Hutu political leader Paul Mirerekano was arrested, but Nuwinkware ordered him released on 1 March. The Ministry of Justice also published a pamphlet in tribute to Rwagasore which he reportedly authored. Muhirwa's government collapsed later that year and in June Pierre Ngendandumwe formed a government with Nuwikware as Minister of Social Affairs. Ngendandumwe was dismissed in June 1964 and replaced by Albin Nyamoya, who retained Nuwinkware in the same portfolio. In January 1965 Ngendandumwe formed a new government with Nuwinkware as Minister of Justice, but was shortly thereafter killed. His successor, Joseph Bamina, retained Nuwinkware in the office.

In 1965 Nuwinkware was co-opted into the Senate. Following a failed coup attempt by Hutu soldiers later that year, he was arrested by the government.

Later life 
Nuwinkware was released from prison in April 1966 but briefly detained again in August. He then found employment at the Official University of Bujumbura, working as its administrative director. During the Ikiza in May 1972 he was arrested by the government for alleged subversion and subsequently executed.

References

Works cited 
 
 
 
 

Hutu people
Justice ministers of Burundi
Union for National Progress politicians
People who died in the Ikiza
1972 deaths